Jim Carrey is a Canadian actor, comedian and artist who has appeared in various feature films, television films/series, along with one video game appearance. He is one of the top-50 highest-grossing actors of all time at the North American box office, with over $2.5 billion total gross and an average of $94.3 million per film. He has been involved with thirteen films that grossed over $250 million at the worldwide box office; the highest-grossing film being Bruce Almighty. Carrey gained his first lead role on the short-lived television series The Duck Factory in 1984, playing a young cartoonist. His first starring role in film was the 1985 comedy horror Once Bitten, with Lauren Hutton as a vampire countess and Carrey playing her victim. He landed supporting roles in films, such as Peggy Sue Got Married (1986), The Dead Pool (1988) and Earth Girls Are Easy (also 1988). In 1990, Carrey received his commercial breakthrough on Fox's In Living Color (1990–1994), where he displayed his character work.

In 1994, Carrey's breakthrough came when he landed the leading role in Ace Ventura: Pet Detective, in which he played a goof-ball detective specialized in crimes involving animals. The film would go on to earn over $72 million at the box office. He went on to star in the sequel Ace Ventura: When Nature Calls in 1995. In 1994, he starred in two commercial successes: The Mask with Cameron Diaz, and Dumb and Dumber with Jeff Daniels. The films ended up grossing $120 million and $127 million, respectively, and established Carrey as a star. Other 1990s films he starred in included Batman Forever (1995), The Cable Guy (1996) and Liar Liar (1997).

In 1998, he gained critical acclaim in the satirical comedy-drama film The Truman Show, in which he played Truman Burbank, a man whose life was, unbeknownst to him, a top-rating reality television show. The film was highly praised and led many to believe he would be nominated for an Oscar, but instead he picked up his first Golden Globe Award for Best Actor in a Motion Picture Drama. In 2000, he returned to comedy reteaming with the Farrelly brothers for Me, Myself & Irene, it received mixed reviews but enjoyed box office success. That same year, Carrey also appeared in How the Grinch Stole Christmas.

Carrey starred opposite Jennifer Aniston and Morgan Freeman in Tom Shadyac's 2003 comedy Bruce Almighty, portraying a television newsman who unexpectedly receives God's omnipotent abilities. It remains his most financially successful film to date. In 2004, he took a role in the critically lauded art-house film Eternal Sunshine of the Spotless Mind, written by Charlie Kaufmann and directed by Michael Gondry. He received his fourth Golden Globe Award nomination, and was also nominated for his first BAFTA Award for Best Actor in a Leading Role. In the 2010s and 2020s, he portrayed Sal Bertolinni / Colonel Stars and Stripes in the black comedy superhero film Kick-Ass 2 (2013), the sequel Dumb and Dumber To with Jeff Daniels again (2014), and the villain Dr. Ivo "Eggman" Robotnik in Sonic the Hedgehog (2020) and it’s 2022 sequel.

Film

Documentary

Television

Music videos

Video game

Web

References 
General

Specific

External links 

 

Carrey, Jim
Carrey, Jim